Chew and Spit (sometimes abbreviated as CHSP or CS) is a compensatory behavior associated with several eating disorders that involves the chewing of food and spitting it out before swallowing, often as an attempt to avoid ingestion of unwanted or unnecessary calories. CS can be used as a way to taste food viewed as “forbidden” or unhealthy. Individuals who partake in CS typically have an increased desire for thinness, increased lack of control (LOC) and body dissatisfaction. CS can serve different functions such as replacing vomiting and/or binging or as an additional behavior to many eating disorders.

CS and like behaviors has been found in several different eating disorders, making it difficult to find a treatment that works as a cure-all. There has been no defined treatment of CS as of now; however, Cognitive behavioral therapy (CBT) has been shown to reduce negative behaviors involved in eating disorders such as bulimia nervosa, anorexia nervosa and many others.

A recent systematic review on the topic, revealed seven themes identified in scholarly articles.

These themes include having potential markers of eating disorder severity (regardless of length of illness contributing to age discrimination. Individuals suffering from CS also showed increased Loss of Control (LOC), Pathological eating, negative emotions and feelings, and Body image distortion. CS sufferers may also be trans-diagnostic (i.e. appears in individuals who have been diagnosed with all or any type of clinical or sub-clinical eating disorder)

Consequences and treatments
Chew and Spit is often associated with and may be a potential gateway to more severe dieting behaviors. Individuals who use CS as a compensatory behavior are more likely to be diagnosed or develop eating disorders. The likelihood is dependent upon the severity of food obsession present. Treatments to eliminate the behavior of chewing and spitting have not yet been developed. However, given the correlation with eating disorders, research suggest treatments that are used for eating disorders such as, Cognitive Behavioral Therapy, may also be effective for eliminating Chewing and Spitting behaviors.

Frequency and tendency
Throughout studies relating to Chew and Spit, it was seen that 34% of individuals with eating disorders partake in CS. This includes all eating disorders such as bulimia, anorexia nervosa, and more. It has also been found that younger individuals are more likely to participate in CS. While younger individuals are more likely to develop CS, this does not determine personality or activity outside of eating behaviors. Overall, CS contributes to body dissatisfaction while body dissatisfaction contributes to CS. CS has also been seen to occur in episodes, rather than consistently. These episodes have been seen to be days to weeks long.

Research
Chew and Spit has not received much attention in the research industry regarding treatment, long term effects of chewing and spitting, and its associations with other behaviors and eating disorders. More research is needed on his topic to further understand the effect this behavior has on individuals physically and psychologically.

References

Diets
Eating disorders
Obesity